Koba Island is also an alternative name for Gupo Island, Taiwan.

Koba Island is an island in the Aru Islands in the Arafura Sea. It is situated in the Maluku Province, Indonesia. Its area is 1723 km². The other main islands in the archipelago are Tanahbesar (also called Wokam), Kobroor, Kola, Maikoor, and Trangan.

See also
 List of islands of Indonesia

References

Aru Islands
Islands of the Maluku Islands